Li Qing (born December 1, 1972) is a female Chinese diver. She competed at 1988 Seoul Olympic Games, and won a silver medal in the women's 3 m springboard.

Li is married to Tan Liangde, also a famous Chinese diver and Olympic medalist. They have a daughter. The Olympic champion, Hu Jia, is their student.

References

1972 births
Living people
Chinese female divers
Olympic silver medalists for China
Olympic medalists in diving
Sportspeople from Hubei
People from Xiaogan
Medalists at the 1988 Summer Olympics
Universiade medalists in diving
Universiade gold medalists for China
Divers at the 1988 Summer Olympics
Medalists at the 1987 Summer Universiade
20th-century Chinese women